The Nyamuliro mine is a large open pit mine located in the south western part of Uganda in Western Region. Nyamuliro represents one of the largest tungsten reserves in Uganda having estimated reserves of 10 million tonnes of ore grading 0.5% tungsten.

See also 
Mining industry of Uganda

References 

Tungsten mines in Uganda